Preska nad Kostrevnico is a settlement in the Municipality of Šmartno pri Litiji in central Slovenia. It lies in the hills east of Velika Kostrevnica in the historical region of Lower Carniola. The municipality is now included in the Central Slovenia Statistical Region.

Name
The name of the settlement was changed from Preska to Preska nad Kostrevnico in 1955.

References

External links
Preska nad Kostrevnico at Geopedia

Populated places in the Municipality of Šmartno pri Litiji